Barefoot Contessa is an American cooking show that premiered November 30, 2002, on Food Network, and is currently the oldest show on the network's daytime schedule. Hosted by celebrity chef Ina Garten, each episode features Garten assembling dishes of varying complexity. Though her specialty is French cuisine, she occasionally prepares American, Asian, British or Italian foods.  Her show also gives tips on decorating and entertaining.

The show's title, which comes from the Italian word for countess, was originally used by Garten in her best-selling cookbook, The Barefoot Contessa Cookbook (1999). The cookbook was in turn named after Garten's specialty food store, which she bought already named in 1978. The store, which is no longer in operation, opened in 1975 and was named after the 1954 film of the same name. Garten sold the store to the employees prior to its closure.

Overview
Garten's show features the preparation of a simple multi-course meal, usually for her close friends, colleagues or husband, Jeffrey. Her recipes often include fresh herbs, which she 'hand-harvests' from her backyard garden. Table settings include both simple and comfort dishes, and are often accompanied by her 'own' flowers or those brought in by Michael Grim, a friend and local florist who is frequently on the show.

Garten deconstructs simple French recipes like boeuf bourguignon or Baba au Rhum cake. She focuses on preparing foods efficiently, allowing more time to eat and spend with guests.

The show is mainly recorded in Garten's home in East Hampton, New York and features fast-moving camera shots and closeups (e.g., fully ripened fruits, eggs falling from the shells, or bubbling pots of homemade stock).

Episode guide

International airings
Barefoot Contessa airs in Australia on Food Network (Australia) and the Lifestyle Food Channel on the Foxtel platform, in the UK on the Food Network UK, in Poland on the channel  Kuchnia.tv, and in the Middle East on the Fatafeat Channel.

Awards and nominations
The show was nominated for a Daytime Emmy Award in 2005 in the category Best Service Show; in the year 2009, it was once again nominated for a Daytime Emmy Award in the categories of Outstanding Culinary Program and Best Culinary Host; Garten won her first Emmy in the latter category.

References

External links
 Barefoot Contessa on The Food Network
 Barefoot Contessa in the UK
 
 

2002 American television series debuts
2000s American cooking television series
2010s American cooking television series
2020s American cooking television series
Daytime Emmy Award for Outstanding Culinary Program winners
English-language television shows
Food Network original programming
Television shows filmed in New York (state)